Frosh is a compilation album series, released on Polygram Records in the late 1990s and early 2000s. The albums collect popular party anthems frequently associated with university and college frosh week festivities.

Track listings

Frosh 1 (1998)
 Blur, "Song 2"
 Spirit of the West, "Home for a Rest"
 The Proclaimers, "I'm Gonna Be (500 Miles)"
 Violent Femmes, "Blister in the Sun"
 Stealers Wheel, "Stuck in the Middle With You"
 The Romantics, "What I Like About You"
 David Wilcox, "Do the Bearcat"
 Denis Leary, "Asshole"
 Beastie Boys, "Fight For Your Right (To Party)"
 Pigbag, "Papa's Got a Brand New Pigbag"
 Gary Glitter, "Rock 'n Roll, Part II"
 The Village People, "YMCA"
 Dexys Midnight Runners, "Come on Eileen"
 Deee-Lite, "Groove is in the Heart"
 Billy Idol, "Mony Mony"
 Iggy Pop, "Lust for Life"
 James, "Laid"

Frosh 2 (1999)
 Chumbawamba, "Tubthumping"
 Great Big Sea, "It's the End of the World as We Know It (And I Feel Fine)"
 The B-52's, "Rock Lobster"
 Bloodhound Gang, "Fire, Water, Burn (The Roof is On Fire)"
 Sloan, "Money City Maniacs"
 The J. Geils Band, "Centerfold"
 New Order, "Bizarre Love Triangle"
 UB40, "Red Red Wine"
 Shabba Ranks w/Krystal, "Twice My Age"
 Biz Markie, "Just a Friend"
 House of Pain, "Jump Around"
 Madness, "One Step Beyond"
 Ashley MacIsaac, "The Devil in the Kitchen"
 The Rocky Horror Picture Show, "The Time Warp"
 The Buggles, "Video Killed the Radio Star"
 ABBA, "Dancing Queen"
 Tom Jones, "It's Not Unusual"
 Semisonic, "Closing Time"

Frosh 3 (2000)
 Violent Femmes, "Add It Up"
 The B-52's, "Love Shack"
 Elvis Costello, "Pump It Up"
 Big Country, "In a Big Country"
 The Human League, "Don't You Want Me"
 The Foundations, "Build Me Up Buttercup"
 Trooper, "We're Here for a Good Time (Not a Long Time)"
 Meat Loaf, "Paradise by the Dashboard Light"
 Simon & Garfunkel, "Cecilia"
 Young MC, "Bust a Move"
 Tone Loc, "Funky Cold Medina"
 Body Count, "Body Count's in the House"
 Twisted Sister, "We're Not Gonna Take It"
 John Travolta & Olivia Newton-John, "The Grease Megamix"
 ABBA, "Take a Chance on Me"
 This 'N That, "Stand by Me"
 The Boomtown Rats, "I Don't Like Mondays"
 Cake, "I Will Survive"

Frosh 4 (2001)
 Three Doors Down, "Kryptonite"
 Matthew Good Band, "Hello Time Bomb"
 DMX, "Party Up"
 Run D.M.C., "It's Tricky"
 DJ Kool, "Let Me Clear My Throat"
 Beenie Man, "Who Am I?"
 Frighty and Colonel Mite, "Life (Is What You Make It)"
 Mr. Vegas, "Heads High"
 Blondie, "The Tide Is High"
 Notorious B.I.G., "Hypnotize"
 Baha Men, "Who Let the Dogs Out?"
 Boney M, "Rasputin"
 Rob Base and DJ E-Z Rock, "It Takes Two"
 The Time, "Jungle Love"
 Bloodhound Gang, "The Bad Touch"
 Afroman, "Because I Got High"
 Billy Idol, "Rebel Yell"
 Twisted Sister, "I Wanna Rock"

Frosh 5 (2002)
 Andrew W.K., "Party Hard"
 Sum 41, "Makes No Difference"
 Hoobastank, "Crawling in the Dark"
 Puddle of Mudd, "Blurry"
 Blink-182, "First Date"
 The Ramones, "Rock n' Roll High School"
 Weezer, "Island in the Sun"
 Sublime, "What I Got"
 U2, "Elevation"
 New Order, "Crystal"
 Ja Rule, "Put it On Me"
 Rockwell, "Somebody's Watching Me"
 Ice Cube feat. Mack 10 and Ms. Toi, "You Can Do It"
 Len, "Funnel"
 KISS, "I Was Made for Lovin' You"
 Primal Scream, "Rocks"
 A Flock of Seagulls, "I Ran"
 Swollen Members, "Lady Venom"
 Adam Sandler, "At a Medium Pace"

Frosh 80s (1998)
 Yazoo, "Don't Go"
 Trans-X, "Living on Video"
 Soft Cell, "Tainted Love"
 Modern English, "I Melt with You"
 The Knack, "My Sharona"
 Toni Basil, "Mickey"
 The Cult, "She Sells Sanctuary"
 Duran Duran, "Hungry Like the Wolf"
 Love & Rockets, "Ball of Confusion"
 Tears for Fears, "Shout"
 Men Without Hats, "The Safety Dance"
 Dexys Midnight Runners, "Come On Eileen"
 The Buggles, "Video Killed the Radio Star"
 Cyndi Lauper, "Girls Just Wanna Have Fun"
 Madness, "Our House"
 Big Country, "In a Big Country"
 Gary Numan, "Cars"
 Yello, "Oh Yeah"
 Icicle Works, "Birds Fly (Whisper to a Scream)"
 Tones on Tail, "Go!"

Frosh 90s (2001)
 The Prodigy, "Firestarter"
 LL Cool J, "Mama Said Knock You Out"
 Digital Underground, "The Humpty Dance"
 Bran Van 3000, "Drinking in L.A."
 Stereo MCs, "Step It Up"
 Cornershop, "Brimful of Asha"
 The New Radicals, "You Get What You Give"
 The Spin Doctors, "Two Princes"
 The Black Crowes, "Hard to Handle"
 Tonic, "If You Could Only See"
 Smash Mouth, "Walkin' on the Sun"
 Sir Mix-a-Lot, "Baby Got Back"
 Onyx, "Slam"
 White Town, "Your Woman"
 Mark Morrison, "Return of the Mack"
 Wreckx-N-Effect, "Rump Shaker"
 Naughty By Nature, "Hip Hop Hooray"

Frosh: The Mullet Years (2002)
 Poison, "Talk Dirty To Me"
 Winger, "Seventeen"
 Cinderella, "Gypsy Road"
 Warrant, "Cherry Pie"
 Skid Row, "Youth Gone Wild"
 Kiss, "Rock And Roll All Nite"
 Great White, "Once Bitten, Twice Shy"
 Quiet Riot, "Cum On Feel The Noize"
 Scorpions, "Rock You Like a Hurricane"
 Whitesnake, "Here I Go Again (Radio Mix)"
 Jackyl, "The Lumber Jack"
 Sum 41, "Pain For Pleasure"

Frosh U: The Best of Frosh (2003)
 Spirit of the West, "Home for a Rest"  4:33
 The Proclaimers, "I'm Gonna Be (500 Miles)"  3:35
 Billy Idol, "Mony Mony"  4:57
 Cyndi Lauper, "Girls Just Wanna Have Fun"  3:54
 John Travolta & Olivia Newton-John, "Grease Megamix"  4:46
 The Rocky Horror Picture Show, "The Time Warp"  3:13
 Deee-Lite, "Groove is in the Heart"  3:51
 New Order, "Bizarre Love Triangle"  6:42
 Dexys Midnight Runners, "Come on Eileen"  4:06
 The Buggles, "Video Killed the Radio Star"  4:09
 ABBA, "Dancing Queen"  3:47
 The Village People, "YMCA"  3:42
 James, "Laid"  2:36
 Violent Femmes, "Blister in the Sun"  2:24
 Elton John, "Crocodile Rock"  3:54
 Van Morrison, "Brown Eyed Girl"  3:00
 Meat Loaf, "Paradise By The Dashboard Light"  8:28

References 

Compilation albums by Canadian artists
Compilation album series
Student culture
1998 compilation albums
1999 compilation albums
2000 compilation albums
2001 compilation albums
2002 compilation albums
2003 compilation albums